Pasadena Police Department may refer to:
Pasadena Police Department (California)
Pasadena Police Department (Texas)